Thomas Kerr Lynch (1818–91) was an Irish explorer.

A younger brother of Henry Blosse Lynch (b. 1807), Thomas was born at Partry House, Ballinrobe (then in County Galway but now in County Mayo) to Major Henry Blosse Lynch (1778-1823). The major had served in the 73rd Regiment and had an estate of fifteen hundred acres north of Ballinrobe. The Lynch family were one of The Tribes of Galway, been descended from Sir Henry Lynch, 1st Baronet who died in 1635.

In 1837 he joined his brother Henry, who commanded an expedition up the river Tigris to Baghdad, a previously unaccomplished voyage.
Thomas went on to establish a steamer service on the Tigris linking Baghdad with India. In the 1850s, Thomas, who had by then travelled extensively throughout Mesopotamia and Persia, was appointed Consul-General for Persia in London. He was made a Knight of the Order of the Lion and the Sun.

Thomas Kerr Lynch died in London in 1891.

References

 The Tribes of Galway:1124-1642, Adrian Martyn, Galway, 2016.

External links
 http://towns.mayo-ireland.ie/WebX?14@50.A2GDbsAaBwp.0@.ee7a995

19th-century Irish people
Irish explorers
People from County Mayo
People from County Galway
1818 births
1891 deaths
Iranian diplomats